The president of the National Congress was the presiding officer of the legislature of Ecuador from 1979 to 2009.

Unicameral Congress 1831-1834

Bicameral Congress 1837-1970

Unicameral Congress 1979-2007 
The legislature was called Chamber of Representatives from 1979 to 1984, and National Congress from 1984 to 2009. 
Below is the list of office-holders 1979—2007:

References

Sources
Various editions of The Europa World Year Book

Ecuador politics-related lists
Ecuador